The University of Mississippi Medical Center School of Dentistry is a dental graduate school that is part of the University of Mississippi. Located in Jackson, Mississippi, U.S. on the campus of the University of Mississippi Medical Center, it is the only dental school in Mississippi.

History 
Founded in March 1973, the University of Mississippi Medical Center School of Dentistry, a part of University of Mississippi admitted its first class in 1975.

Academics 
The University of Mississippi Medical Center School of Dentistry of Dentistry awards following degrees:
Doctor of Dental Medicine
The school ranks fifth in part one of the National Board Dental Examination (2000) and the sixth in the part two of the National Board Dental Examinations (2001).

Departments 
University of Mississippi Medical Center School of Dentistry includes following departments:
Advanced General Dentistry
Biomedical Materials Science
Care Planning and Restorative Sciences 
Endodontics
Oral-Maxillofacial Surgery and Pathology
Orthodontics
Pediatric and Public Health Dentistry
Periodontics and Preventive Sciences

Accreditation 
The University of Mississippi Medical Center School of Dentistry is currently accredited by American Dental Association (ADA).

References

Dental schools in Mississippi
Dentistry
Education in Hinds County, Mississippi
Educational institutions established in 1973
1973 establishments in Mississippi